Ayad Hamid Khalaf Al-Jumaili (also known as Abu Yahya; Arabic: أياد الجميلي) is a senior leader in the Islamic State of Iraq and the Levant (ISIL) and an intelligence official under the government of former President of Iraq Saddam Hussein.

History
Jumaili is a former intelligence officer from Fallujah under the government of former President of Iraq Saddam Hussein. After the U.S.-led invasion, he joined the Sunni insurgency and answered directly to Abu Bakr al-Baghdadi. He is the head of Amniyat (the Arabic word for 'security') in Iraq and Syria, ISIL's intelligence and public security department. An Iraqi intelligence spokesman announced on 1 April 2017 that he was killed along with two other ISIL commanders in an airstrike by the Iraqi Air Force in the region of al-Qaim. The statement described him as the second-in-command of ISIL and as a war minister. The US-led anti-ISIL coalition meanwhile said it was unable to confirm the information about his death.

References

Islamic State of Iraq and the Levant members from Iraq
People of the War in Iraq (2013–2017)
Possibly living people